This is a list of the Canada men's national soccer team results from its origin in 1924 to 1977.

Results

1924

1925

1926

1927

1957

1968

1972

1973

1974

1975

1976

1977

References

Soccer in Canada
1920s in Canadian sports
1950s in Canadian sports
1960s in Canadian sports
1970s in Canadian sports
Canada men's national soccer team results